Graham Abbey (born Graham Robert Thomson Abbey, March 24, 1971) is a Canadian film, television and stage actor, who is best known for his role as Gray Jackson in TV drama The Border.

History 
At the then Stratford Festival of Canada, the eleven-year-old Graham Abbey took up small parts in A Midsummer Night's Dream and The Merry Wives of Windsor.  In the following season, he returned with roles in As You Like It and Macbeth.  His first role was as a forest gnome at the Festival Theatre, and he explained his interest as: "there was a room full of doughnuts and I got to get out of school".

After two years at Stratford, he gave up acting.  He left Stratford Central Secondary School, moved to Kingston, Ontario, and in 1994, graduated from Queen's University with a degree in political science.

In 1997, he rejoined the Stratford Festival with a leading role (Happy Loman in Death of a Salesman), a supporting role (Paris in Romeo and Juliet), and an ensemble role (the Chorus in Oedipus Rex).  He has performed in over 30 productions at the Festival, and continues to be a part of the company as of 2016, during which season he debuted his adaptation of Shakespeare's Henriad, Breath of Kings

In August 2008, he married former Stratford colleague Michelle Giroux.

Credits

Film and television credits 
 As You Like It (1984), based on the 1983 production at the Stratford Festival of Canada—Page
 John Woo's Once a Thief (1998) —  Special Agent Elk Diller in episode "The Director Files"
 Offstage, Onstage: Inside the Stratford Festival (2002), the National Film Board behind-the-scenes at the Stratford Festival of Canada's 49th season — himself
 The Madness of King Richard (2003), interviews with members of the theatre community, regarding the Stratford Festival of Canada under artistic director Richard Monette — himself
 'Til Death Do Us Part (2007) — Slade in episode "Funeral Parlour Murder"
 The Jane Show (2007) — Richard in episode "Who's Got Spirit?"
 Billable Hours (2007) — Scott in episode "Monopoly Man, the Second"
 Heartland (2007) — Steve Redding in episode "Coming Home"
 Degrassi: The Next Generation — Glen Martin
 The Border (2008) — Gray Jackson
 Othello: The Tragedy of the Moor (2008) — Michael Cassio
 Stealing Paradise TV film (2011) - Steven Collier
 Republic of Doyle (2012) — George
 King John (2015) — King Philip
 Angels and Ornaments (2014)  -  Dave
 Frontier (2016) - MacLaughlan
 Stay the Night (2022)

Stratford Festival credits 
 "Coriolanus" (2018) -- Tullus Aufidius
 "Tartuffe" (2017) -- Orgon
 King John (play) (2014) -- Philip the Bastard
 Othello (2013) -- Iago
 Coriolanus (2006) -- Tullus Aufidius
 The Lark (2005) -- Warwick, Earl of Beauchamp
 As You Like It (2005) -- Jacques
 King Henry VIII (All is True) (2004) -- King Henry VIII
Macbeth (2004) -- Macbeth
Love's Labour's Lost (2003) -- Berowne
The Taming of the Shrew (2003) -- Petruchio
Richard III, Reign of Terror (2002) -- King Henry VII, Earl of Richmond
The Scarlet Pimpernel (2002) -- Lambert
Romeo and Juliet (2002) -- Romeo
Henry V (2001) -- King Henry V
Henry IV, Part 2 (2001) -- Henry, Prince of Wales
Henry IV, Part 1 (2001) -- Henry, Prince of Wales
The Three Musketeers (2000) -- D'Artagnan
The Importance of Being Earnest (2000) -- Algernon Montford
Hamlet (2000) -- Laertes
The School for Scandal (1999) -- Sir Toby Bumper
The Tempest (1999) -- Ferdinand
A Midsummer Night's Dream (1999) -- Lysander
Two Gentlemen of Verona (1998) -- Valentine
The Winter's Tale (1998) -- Florizel
A Man for All Seasons (1998) -- William Roper
Oedipus Rex (1997) -- Chorus
Death of a Salesman (1997) -- Happy Loman
Romeo and Juliet (1997) -- Paris
As You Like It (1983) -- Page
Macbeth (1983) -- Young Macduff (understudy)
A Midsummer Night's Dream (1982) -- Appears in
The Merry Wives of Windsor (1982) -- Forest Gnome

Other theatre credits 
The Pessimist, Tarragon Theatre, Toronto (2007) -- Philip
Long Day's Journey Into Night, Manitoba Theatre Centre, Winnipeg (2005) -- Jamie
Death of a Salesman, Theatre Aquarius (2004) -- Biff Loman
The Molière Comedies, Shubert Theatre, Chicago (2003) -- Valère
Robin Hood: The Merry Family Musical, Elgin Theatre, Toronto (2002) -- Robin Hood
Snow White and the Magnificent Seven, Elgin Theatre, Toronto (2001) -- Prince Don "Squeeze the" Charming
Proposals, Manitoba Theatre Centre, Winnipeg/Royal Alexandra Theatre, Toronto (1998) -- Ray Dolenz
Hello, Dolly!, York Minstrels, Toronto (1995) -- Cornelius Hackl
The School for Scandal, Chicago Shakespeare Theatre—Charles Surface
A Midsummer Night's Dream, Festival of Classics, Toronto—Demetrius
The Baker's Wife, Equity Showcase, Toronto—Antoine
A Streetcar Named Desire, Firehall Theatre, Gananoque, Ontario—Stanley Kowalski
Guys and Dolls, Grand Theatre, Kingston, Ontario—Nicely-Nicely
Fiddler on the Roof, Grand Theatre, Kingston, Ontario—Motel the Tailor

References

External links 

Abbey speaking on "CBC Radio: Q The Podcast" episode for Monday, January 7, 2008
Stratford Theatre Festival biography

In the news 
"Border star steady with sword as well as gun", The Toronto Star, September 27, 2008
"Graham Abbey makes a run for The Border", The Kingston Whig-Standard, January 26, 2008
"Crossing those acting borders", The Windsor Star, January 7, 2008
"Investigating The Border", Metro Canada, January 7, 2008
"From the Bard to Border guard", The Globe and Mail, January 5, 2008
"The Border's Niagara connection", St. Catharines Standard, December 13, 2007
"Abbey not pessimistic as he leaves Stratford", The Toronto Star, April 22, 2007

1971 births
Canadian male stage actors
Canadian male television actors
Living people
People from Stratford, Ontario
Male actors from Toronto
Canadian male Shakespearean actors